André Neher (22 October 1914 – 23 October 1988) was a French Jewish scholar and philosopher.

Biography
Neher was born in Obernai, Bas-Rhin. He was a student at the Collège Freppel in Obernai, then at the Lycée Fustel de Coulange in Strasbourg. He became professor at the Collège Erckmann-Chatrian in Phalsbourg, then at the Lycée Kléber in Strasbourg. During World War II, he lived in Brive-la-Gaillarde, where he was a member of Rabbi David Feuerwerker's community. After the War, he became a professor at the University of Strasbourg in 1948. In 1974, at age 60, Neher moved with his wife, Renée Neher-Bernheim to Jerusalem, Israel.

L'Exil de la Parole

His masterpiece is The Exile of the Word (L'Exil de la Parole. Du silence biblique au silence d'Auschwitz, Ed.: Seuil, 1970), about the biblical silence, and God's silence after the Shoah and the great world tragedies. Neher thinks that through the Bible's silence one can discover divine revelation; through the silence human freedom is possible. He draws on the image of a suspension bridge to describe human "ontological insecurity and pain" caused by this freedom,  which is characterized by a "radical factor of  uncertainty". For this reason it is necessary to concentrate our attention not on the ideas of redemption or salvation, but on "being here in our life".

Writings
  (1946; Transcendence and immanence)
  (1950; Amos, contribution to the study of the prophecy)
  (1955; Quality of Prophecy)
  (1951; Notes on Ecclesiastes)
  (1956; Moses and the Jewish vocation)
  (1958; The conflict of sacred and profane in the renaissance of Hebrew)
  (1960; Jeremiah)
  (1962; Biblical history of the people of Israel) — with Renée Neher
  (1962; The Jewish Existence)
  (1962; The Well of the Exile, dialectical theology of Maharal of Prague)
  (1969; From Hebrew to French) — a manual for translating the Hebrew language into French
  (1970; The Exile of the Word, from the silence of the Bible to the silence of Auschwitz)
  (1972; Within your gates, Jerusalem)
  (1979; They rebuilt their soul) 
  (1984; Jerusalem, Lived Jerusalem And Message) 
  (1974; David Gans, 1541-1613 : disciple of Maharal, assistant of Tycho Brahe and of Johannes Kepler) ; English translation as Jewish thought and the scientific revolution of the sixteenth century : David Gans (1541-1613) and his times (1986) OUP. .
  (1987; Faust and Maharal of Prague : myth and reality) .
 "At the methodological crossroad: The dispute with Eliezer Ashkenazi" in Rabbinic Theology and Jewish Intellectual History: The Great Rabbi Loew of Prague (2013)

See also
 Isaac Luria
 David Gans
 Maharal of Prague
 Jacob L. Moreno

Notes

External links
André Neher - Man is not Alone
 "At the methodological crossroads: The dispute with Eliezer Ashkenazi"

1914 births
1988 deaths
20th-century French rabbis
Academic staff of Tel Aviv University
Alsatian Jews
Jewish philosophers
People from Obernai
Philosophers of Judaism
Academic staff of the University of Strasbourg
French Orthodox Jews
Burials at the Jewish cemetery on the Mount of Olives